Georgi Antonov (born 7 July 1970 in Vratsa) is a former Bulgarian footballer who played as a defender.

Honours

Club
 CSKA Sofia
 Bulgarian A Group: 2002–03

References

External links 
 

1970 births
Living people
Bulgarian footballers
Bulgaria international footballers
Association football defenders
First Professional Football League (Bulgaria) players
FC Botev Vratsa players
PFC Litex Lovech players
FC Lokomotiv 1929 Sofia players
PFC CSKA Sofia players
People from Vratsa